Fred G. Klunk (July 30, 1910 – March 23, 1975) is a former Democratic member of the Pennsylvania House of Representatives.

References

Democratic Party members of the Pennsylvania House of Representatives
1910 births
1975 deaths
20th-century American politicians